The Pink Revolution in India refers to a tag by prime minister Narendra Modi criticizing the Indian government's then-existing favor for cattle meat production over India's already-increasing buffalo meat production, a favor that allegedly created fake cattle production subsidies.

Buffalo meat exports
Uttar Pradesh was the top buffalo meat-producing state with 3 lakh tonne produced in 2011. From 2009 to 2013, India beef exports had risen 44%.

References

Agriculture in India
Revolutions